This is a list of Techland video games.

Games developed

Cancelled and delayed projects 
 Chrome 2 (on hold)
 Day of the Mutants (cancelled)
 Warhound (on hold)
 Hellraid (on hold)

Games published

Notes

References

Techland